The Al-Falah Mosque is the main mosque of UEP Subang Jaya. It is located in USJ 9 in Subang Jaya, Selangor, Malaysia.

See also
 Islam in Malaysia

Mosques in Selangor